Muratbek Sansyzbayevich Imanaliyev (born 25 February 1956) is the former foreign minister of Kyrgyzstan from 1991 to 1992 and from 1 July 1997 to 2002. He also served as the Secretary-General of the Shanghai Cooperation Organisation from 2010 to 2012.

Career 
From 1991 to 1992 he was foreign minister of Kyrgyzstan
From 1993 to 1996 he was ambassador in Beijing.
From 1996 to 1997 he was head of the International Department of the Administration of the President of Kyrgyzstan.
From 1997 to 2002 he was foreign minister of Kyrgyzstan.
From 2002 to 2007 he was Professor at the American University of Central Asia.
From 2005 to 2009 he was President of the Institute of Public Policy.

References

1956 births
Living people
Sportspeople from Bishkek
Foreign ministers of Kyrgyzstan
Government ministers of Kyrgyzstan
Ambassadors of Kyrgyzstan to China